The D.I.C.E. Award for Outstanding Achievement in Original Music Composition is an award presented annually by the Academy of Interactive Arts & Sciences during the academy's annual D.I.C.E. Awards. This award is "presented to the individual or team whose work represents the highest level of achievement in original musical composition for an interactive title. Both the quality of the score and the integration of the score into the title will be considered when determining the recipient of the award."

The award's most recent winner was God of War Ragnarök, developed by Santa Monica Studio and published by Sony Interactive Entertainment.

Winners and nominees

2000s

2010s

2020s

Multiple nominations and wins

Developers and publishers 
Sony has published the most nominees and winners. It also has the most nominees for a single year, with four. Sony and Electronic Arts are the only publishers to have published back-to-back winners. Their former subsidiary EA Los Angeles and Sony's Santa Monica Studio have developed the most winning titles. EA Black Box's first win was while they were still called "DreamWorks Interactive". EA Los Angeles is the only developer that developed back-to-back winners. Blizzard Entertainment has developed the most nominees, but none have ever won. Ubisoft has published the most nominees without having a single winner.

Franchises 
Warcraft has had the most nominees, but has never actually won. God of War has won the most times, and is the only franchise with back-to-back wins. The only other franchises with multiple wins are Medal of Honor and BioShock.

Notes

References 

D.I.C.E. Awards
Awards established in 2000